Matthias Paul (born 15 July 1964 in Frankfurt (Oder)) is a German actor, singer and director.

Life and career 
Matthias Paul has been living in Berlin since 1972. After school, he completed an apprenticeship as an aircraft mechanic at Berlin-Schönefeld Airport. Later he went to the television of the GDR and worked as the first camera assistant. From 1987 to 1991 he studied at the Ernst Busch Academy of Dramatic Arts, Berlin. In 1996, he attended the Actors Workshop with Eric Morris in Los Angeles.

Paul works as an actor and presenter. He also speaks audiobooks and was on stage as a singer of chansons and love ballads. In 1999, he played a major role in the action series "".

Since 2009 he works as a director for television, increasingly for soap operas, and has directed some 300 episodes (up to 2019).

He is married since September 2006, lives in Pritzwalk and Berlin and has 3 children.

Theatre 
 1994: Romeo & Julia (Kleist-Theater Frankfurt (Oder))
 1993: Michael Kohlhaas (Kleist-Theater Frankfurt (Oder))
 1993:  (Kleist-Theater Frankfurt (Oder))
 1993: Exekutor 14 (Kleist-Theater Frankfurt (Oder))
 1992: Leonce & Lena (Theater Kampnagel Hamburg)
 1992: Der Cassernower (Kleine Bühne Das Ei at Friedrichstadt-Palast Berlin)
 1992: Penthesilea (Kleist-Theater Frankfurt (Oder))
 1992: Frühlingserwachen
 1991: Das Wintermärchen (Schaubühne am Lehniner Platz Berlin)
 1989: Der Lohndrücker (Deutsches Theater Berlin)

Filmography

Actor 
 1991: 
 1992: Zorc-Tim
 1993: Fahrschule Kampmann
 1994: Feuerbach
 1995: Coeur pour coeur, dent pour dent
 1995: 
 1995: Eine Frau wird gejagt
 1995: Kinder der Nacht
 1996: Boom Baby Boom
 1996: 
 1996: Hollister
 1997: Die Geliebte (television series): Jedes Ende ist ein neuer Anfang
 1997: Lisa Falk, Anwältin
 1997: Ritter der Lüfte
 1998: Einfach Klasse…
 1998: Medicopter 117 – Jedes Leben zählt (television series): 
 1998: SK-Babies (television series): Der Ausbrecher
 1999–2000:  (television series, 23 episodes)
 1999: In aller Freundschaft (television series, 5 episodes)
 1999–2002: Alarm für Cobra 11 – Die Autobahnpolizei (television series, 3 episodes, including Vater und Sohn)
 2003: Der Zauberstein
 2003: Ei verbibbsch
 2003: Die Rosenheim-Cops (television series): Die sündige Sennerin
 2004: 
 2004: Sabine! (television series, 7 episodes)
 2004: Sharia-Gods Law
 2004: Siska (television series): Zuerst kommt die Angst
 2006–2007: Schmetterlinge im Bauch (soap, 82 episodes)
 2007: Spielzeugland
 2007–2008: Rote Rosen (soap, 16 episodes)
 2008–2009: Rosamunde Pilcher:  (series, 6 episodes)
 2010–2011: Schloss Einstein (television series, 53 episodes)
 2014–2015: 
 2015: : 
 2017: Professor T.: Der perfekte Mord
 2017: 
 2017–2018: Tatort: 
 2018: Happiness is a warm gun (short film)

Director 
 1998: The Real Psycho (short film)
 1997: Schrei leise (short film)
 2009: Gute Zeiten, schlechte Zeiten (soap, RTL)
 2009–2010: Verbotene Liebe (soap, ARD)
 2010–2011: Anna und die Liebe (soap, Sat.1, 14 episodes)
 2010–2013: Alles was zählt (soap, RTL, 107 episodes)

References

Further reading

External links 
 
 

German directors
German male stage actors
German male television actors
German male actors
Male actors from Berlin
20th-century German male actors
21st-century German male actors
German television presenters
1964 births
Living people